Vladeck is a surname. Notable people with the surname include:

Baruch Charney Vladeck (1886–1938), American labor leader and politician
David Vladeck (born 1951), American civil servant
Judith Vladeck (1923–2007), American lawyer
Stephen Vladeck, American professor of law

See also
Vladeck Houses, housing development in Manhattan, New York City, USA